The Alexander ALX300 (later known as the TransBus ALX300 and the Alexander Dennis ALX300) was a low-floor bus body manufactured by Alexander and later Alexander Dennis in Falkirk, Scotland. It was launched in 1997 as a replacement for the Strider and the PS type. 

A total of 749 were completed on MAN 18.220 (576), Volvo B10BLE (110) and DAF SB220 (63) chassis. It has a rounded roof dome similar to the ALX200, a deep double-curvature windscreen with plastic mouldings under the windscreen to make it look deeper and a separate destination sign. 

The ALX300 on MAN 18.220 chassis was the favoured full-size single-decker bus of Stagecoach with over 500 purchased. Despite the arrival of the Enviro300 in 2001, which was aimed at the same market, Stagecoach continued to prefer the ALX300, with deliveries continuing until 2007 when it switched to the Enviro300 on MAN 18.240 chassis.

References

External links

ALX300
Low-entry buses
Low-floor buses
Single-deck buses
Vehicles introduced in 1997